Alopecosa striatipes is a wolf spider species in the genus Alopecosa found in Europe and Central Asia.

See also
 List of Lycosidae species

References

striatipes
Spiders of Europe
Spiders of Asia
Spiders described in 1839